Russkoe pole eksperimentov (Russian field of experiments) is the seventeenth studio album by Soviet/Russian punk band Grazhdanskaya Oborona. The songs reflect the influence of noise punk, hardcore and industrial music and contain dark lyrics inspired by existentialist philosophy and literature. The final title track's length is almost 15 minutes.

In 2010, Afisha ranked the album at 25 on its list of «The 50 Greatest Russian Albums of All Time».

Release 
The album was released in autumn 1989. It was the last album from the 1989 album series (Pesni radosti i schast'ya, Zdorovo i vechno, Voyna and «Armageddon-pops) and one of the band's most popular albums.

Background 
In 1988 Grazhdanskaya Oborona recruited a full band: Yegor Letov as lead singer and guitarist, his friend Kuzya «UO» on guitar and bass, Igor Zhevtun («Jeff») as a lead guitarist and Arkady Klimkin on drums. In 1989 they played records at the Auktyon rehearsal point and then recorded music in Letov's apartment.

The songs "Lobotomiya" and "Vershki i koreshki" were dedicated to the memory of the late Dmitry Selivanov and were originally written for the musical project Kommunizm. The title track quotes Bertrand Russell: "A smell of petroleum prevails throughout" (In Letov's interpretation "Eternity smells like petroleum"/). Letov considered this song one of his best compositions.

Track listing

Personnel

Grazhdanskaya Oborona 
 Yegor Letov – vocals, guitars, bass guitars, production
 Konstantin Ryabinov (Kuzya UO) – backing vocals, guitars, bass guitars, flute
 Igor Zhevtun (Jeff) – guitars, percussion on «Beri Shinel' / Like A Rolling Stone»
 Yanka Dyagileva – backing vocals on «Beri Shinel' / Like A Rolling Stone»
 Sergey Zelensky – bass on «Lobotomiya»
 Arkady Klimkin – drums

Technical
 Yegor Letov – art design, album design, remastering (1989, 2007)
 Natalia Chumakova – photography, album design, remastering (2007)

References

External links 
 
 Russkoe pole experimentov on MuzicBrainz
 Russkoe pole experimentov on Discogs

1989 albums
Grazhdanskaya Oborona albums
Industrial rock albums
Hardcore punk albums by Russian artists
Industrial albums by Russian artists